This is a list of video games for the Game Boy Advance video game console that have sold or shipped at least one million copies. The best-selling games on the Game Boy Advance are Pokémon Ruby and Sapphire. First released in Japan on November 21, 2002, they went on to sell over 16million units worldwide. Pokémon FireRed and LeafGreen, enhanced remakes of the original Pokémon Red, Green and Blue games, are the second-best-selling games on the platform with sales in excess of 12million units combined. Pokémon Emerald, an enhanced version of Ruby and Sapphire, is third with sales of more than 7million units. The top five is rounded out by Mario Kart: Super Circuit and Super Mario World: Super Mario Advance 2, each of which sold over 5.5million units.

There are a total of 40 Game Boy Advance games on this list which are confirmed to have sold or shipped at least one million units. Of these, eleven were developed by internal Nintendo development divisions. Other developers with the most million-selling games include Game Freak with three games, and HAL Laboratory, Intelligent Systems, and Flagship, with two games each in the list of 40. Of the 40 games on this list, 31 were published in one or more regions by Nintendo. Other publishers with multiple million-selling games include The Pokémon Company with five games, THQ with three games, and Konami and Namco with two games each. The most popular franchises on Game Boy Advance include Pokémon (over 39million combined units) and Super Mario (16.69million combined units).

List

Notes

References

External links
 Nintendo official website

Game Boy Advance
Best-selling Game Boy Advance video games